William Charles Winsor (September 12, 1876 – May 7, 1963) was a Canadian mariner and political figure in Newfoundland. He represented Bay de Verde from 1904 to 1908, Bonavista Bay from 1908 to 1913 and from 1924 to 1928 and Bonavista North from 1932 to 1934 in the Newfoundland and Labrador House of Assembly.

He was born in Swain's Island on Bonavista Bay, the son of William Winsor and Emma Whiteway, and was educated in Wesleyville. Winsor married Josephine, the daughter of Samuel Blandford. He commanded schooners employed in the Labrador and seal fisheries. Winsor was defeated when he ran for reelection in 1913, 1919, 1923 and 1928. He served in the Executive Council as Minister of Marine and Fisheries and then again later as Minister of Posts and Telegraphs. After leaving politics, Winsor continued to work as a mariner until the age of 77. He died in St. John's at the age of 86.

References 

Members of the Newfoundland and Labrador House of Assembly
1876 births
1963 deaths
Sea captains
Newfoundland Colony people
Government ministers of the Dominion of Newfoundland